Phil Wilson (born 14 September 1965) is a Scottish curler from Stranraer. Wilson played for Great Britain at the 1998 Winter Olympics in Nagano, Japan.

References

External links
 

1965 births
Living people
Scottish male curlers
British male curlers
Olympic curlers of Great Britain
Curlers at the 1998 Winter Olympics
Sportspeople from Dumfries